Marko Karamarko (born 27 March 1993 in Croatia) is a Croatian footballer, who plays for Velež Mostar.

Club career
At the age of 5, Karamarko joined the youth academy of Schalke 04 in the German Bundesliga.

In 2014, he signed for Belgian second division side K. Patro Eisden Maasmechelen after playing for SC Preußen Münster, Sportfreunde Lotte, and SG Wattenscheid 09 in the German lower leagues.

In 2017, Karamarko signed for Croatian top flight outfit HNK Cibalia, scoring both his first goals as a professional footballer in a 2–5 loss to GNK Dinamo Zagreb, Croatia's most successful team.

For 2020, he  signed for FK Žalgiris, Lithuania's most successful club.

References

External links
 Marko Karamarko at Soccerway

1993 births
Living people
Association football defenders
Croatian footballers
Sportfreunde Lotte players
SG Wattenscheid 09 players
K. Patro Eisden Maasmechelen players
FC Wegberg-Beeck players
NK Sesvete players
HNK Cibalia players
NK Slaven Belupo players
FK Žalgiris players
NK Croatia Zmijavci players
Regionalliga players
Challenger Pro League players
First Football League (Croatia) players
Croatian Football League players
A Lyga players
Croatian expatriate footballers
Expatriate footballers in Belgium
Croatian expatriate sportspeople in Belgium
Expatriate footballers in Lithuania
Croatian expatriate sportspeople in Lithuania